Bitter may refer to:

Common uses
 Resentment, negative emotion or attitude, similar to being jaded, cynical or otherwise negatively affected by experience
 Bitter (taste), one of the five basic tastes

Books 
 Bitter (novel), a 2022 novel by Akwaeke Emezi.

Food and drink
 Bitter (beer), a British term for pale ale
 Bitters, an herbal preparation now used mostly in cocktails

Music

Albums
 Bitter (Jupiter Apple album), 2007
 Bitter (Meshell Ndegeocello album), 1999

Songs
 "Bitter" (Fletcher song), 2020
 “Bitter” song by The Vamps from Cherry Blossom
 "Bitter", 1997 single by Lit from Tripping the Light Fantastic
 "Bitter", song by Jill Sobule from her 1997 album Happy Town
 "Bitter", single by New Zealand band Shihad
 "Bitter", song by Remy Zero from The Golden Hum
 "Bitter", song by Reks from More Grey Hairs

Other uses
 Bitter (surname) (including a list of persons with the name)
 Bitter Cars, a German car company

See also
 Bitter end (disambiguation)
 Bitterlich (disambiguation)
 Bittern (disambiguation)
 The Bitter End (disambiguation)